The Miami Hurricanes women's basketball team represents the University of Miami in women's basketball. The school competes in the Atlantic Coast Conference in Division I of the National Collegiate Athletic Association (NCAA). 

Miami Hurricanes women's basketball team plays their home games at Watsco Center on the University of Miami campus in Coral Gables, Florida. The team's head coach is Katie Meier.

Season-by-season record

As of the 2021–22 season, the Hurricanes have a 830–585 all-time record since the program's launch in 1972. The team's best finish in the NCAA tournament was in 1992 when they reached the Sweet Sixteen, losing to Vanderbilt 77–67 in the tournament's regional semifinals.

NCAA tournament results

References

External links
 

Miami Hurricanes women's basketball
Sports in Coral Gables, Florida